The golden-fronted woodpecker (Melanerpes aurifrons) is a species of bird in subfamily Picinae of the woodpecker family Picidae. It is found in the southern United States and Mexico.

Taxonomy and systematics

The golden-fronted woodpecker's taxonomy has not been settled. The American Ornithological Society, the Clements taxonomy, and BirdLife International's Handbook of the Birds of the World (HBW) assign it 12 subspecies. The International Ornithological Committee (IOC) treats it as a monotypic species, and assigns the other 11 subspecies to Velasquez's woodpecker (Melanerpes santacruzi).

This article follows the IOC monotypic-species model.

Description

Males and females have the same plumage except for the pattern on their heads. Adult males have a red crown and a golden orange to yellow nape with a gap between them; females have a grayish crown and a paler yellow nape. On adults of both sexes the rest of the head is various shades of gray. Their upperparts are mostly barred black and white, with white uppertail coverts that have a few black spots. Their flight feathers are black with variable amounts of white on the primaries. Their tail is mostly black with variable amounts of white on the outermost three pairs of feathers. Their underparts are smoke gray to drab gray with light blackish bars on the flanks and undertail coverts and a yellow patch on the belly. Their iris is deep red to reddish brown, their bill is black to grayish black, and their legs and feet are grayish green to greenish gray. Juveniles are duller overall than adults, with little or no orange on the nape, indistinct barring on the upperparts, and fine dusky streaks on the underparts. Males have a small red crown patch and females just a few red feathers there.

Distribution and habitat

The golden-fronted woodpecker is found from southwestern Oklahoma through central Texas onto the Mexican Plateau as far as Jalisco, San Luis Potosí, and Hidalgo. It is a casual visitor to New Mexico and has strayed further north and east. It inhabits both mesic and xeric landscapes. It favors the latter, which include mesquite brushlands and riparian woodlands. It also frequents urban parks and suburban areas.

Behavior

Movement

The golden-fronted woodpecker is a year-round resident throughout its range.

Feeding

The golden-fronted woodpecker's diet is adult and larval arthropods, some aerial insects, much fruit and nuts, and corn. It has been observed predating other birds' eggs. The species forages mainly in trees, especially on major limbs and typically below . It also forages on open or grassy ground but seldom under brush. It takes its food by gleaning, pecking, probing, and least frequently by aerial flycatching.

Breeding

The golden-fronted woodpecker usually remains paired year-round, and is territorial even outside the nesting season. In Texas it breeds between March and July, and often produces two broods per year. Both sexes excavate the nest cavity in the trunk or limb of a tree, both live and dead. It also sometimes uses utility poles, fence posts, and nest boxes. Most clutches are of four or five eggs, and both sexes incubate. The incubation period is 12 to 14 days and fledging occurs about 30 days after hatch.

Vocal and non-vocal sounds

The golden-fronted woodpecker's call is "a loud harsh kirrr or a hard tig tig" that is often repeated in a series. Its drumming is "short and relatively slow".

Status

The IUCN follows HBW taxonomy and so has not assessed the golden-fronted woodpecker separately from Velasquez's woodpecker. The golden-fronted woodpecker sensu lato is considered to be of Least Concern, with a stable population. It is considered common in much of Texas; population data from Mexico is sparse. It "appears to adjust well to human-altered environments, occupying parks and urban areas."

References

External links

Golden-fronted woodpecker, a bibliographic resource

Further reading

golden-fronted woodpecker
Native birds of the Plains-Midwest (United States)
Birds of the Rio Grande valleys
Birds of Mexico
golden-fronted woodpecker
golden-fronted woodpecker